Additive genetic effects occur when two or more genes source a single contribution to the final phenotype, or when alleles of a single gene (in heterozygotes) combine so that their combined effects equal the sum of their individual effects. Non-additive genetic effects involve dominance (of alleles at a single locus) or epistasis (of alleles at different loci).

See also
 Quantitative genetics

References

Genetics